Structured data analysis (SDA) is a method for analysing the flow of information within an organization using data flow diagrams. It was originally developed by IBM for systems analysis in electronic data processing, although it has now been adapted for use to describe the flow of information in any kind of project or organization, particularly in the construction industry where the nodes could be departments, contractors, customers, managers, workers etc.

See also
Information management
Data modelling
Structured Systems Analysis and Design Method

Further reading
CONSTRUCTION SITE INFORMATION NEEDS
 
 

Systems analysis
Project management techniques